The Icelandic Communist League was a grouping affiliated with the Socialist Workers Party (USA), a part of its international network of affiliates, the so-called Pathfinder Tendency. The Icelandic Communist League was unique in this tendency in that, while like its sister parties it too was very small, it was for a few years the only, and hence dominant, communist grouping in its country.

Its origins lie in the Young Socialists.  Some members formed the Organizing Committee for a Communist League in 2001, and in 2002 declared the "Communist League".

The Communist League has not been active in Iceland since 2006 or 2007.

Defunct political parties in Iceland
Trotskyist organizations in Europe
Communist parties in Iceland
Political parties established in 2002
2002 establishments in Iceland
Political parties disestablished in the 2000s
2000s disestablishments in Iceland